Brett Neveu is an American playwright, and ensemble member at A Red Orchid Theatre in Chicago.

Work
Theatre productions include Traitor with A Red Orchid Theatre (Chicago), To Catch a Fish with Timeline Theatre (Chicago)  and Her America with The Greenhouse Theatre (Chicago). Film/TV productions include Night's End with AMC/Shudder, the short Convo with Breakwall Pictures and the feature The Earl with Intermission Productions. Past work includes productions with 59e59 Theatre in New York; The Royal Court Theatre and The Royal Shakespeare Company in London; The Goodman Theatre, Writers Theatre, The House Theatre, The Inconvenience, TimeLine Theatre Company, A Red Orchid Theatre and American Theatre Company in Chicago. A Sundance Institute Ucross Fellow, Brett is also a recipient of the Marquee Award from Chicago Dramatists, the Ofner Prize for New Work, the Emerging Artist Award from The League of Chicago Theatres, an After Dark Award for Outstanding Musical (Old Town) and has developed plays with companies including The Atlantic Theatre Company and The New Group in New York and The Goodman Theatre, Steppenwolf Theatre and Victory Gardens Theatre in Chicago. He is a resident-alum of Chicago Dramatists, a proud ensemble member of A Red Orchid Theatre, a founding member of the playwright collective MC-10, an alumni member of TimeLine Theatre Company's Writers Collective and Center Theatre Group's Playwrights’ Workshop in Los Angeles. Brett has been commissioned by The Royal Court Theatre, Manhattan Theatre Club, Steppenwolf Theatre Company, The Goodman Theatre, House Theatre, TimeLine Theatre Company, Writers Theatre, Strawdog Theatre, Northlight Theatre and has several of his plays published through Broadway Play Publishing, Dramatic Publishing and Nick Hern Publishing. Brett has taught writing at DePaul University, Second City Training Center and currently teaches writing for the screen and stage at Northwestern University. He adapted his play Eric Larue into a screenplay to be directed as a feature film by A Red Orchid Theatre founding member Michael Shannon.

Reviews
Traitor, 2018

The Meek, 2007

"Hero Villain Casts a Spell Without a Villain"

"Detective Partner Hero Villain""

Publication

Harmless: Part I of Trilogy '04, 05' '06 (2016)
Weapon of Mass Impact: Part II of Trilogy '04, '05, '06 (2016)
Old Glory: Part III of Trilogy '04, '05, '06 (2016)
Drawing War (2007)
Eagle Hills, Eagle Ridge, Eagle Landing (2007)
The Last Barbecue (2007)
Megacosm

all by Broadway Play Publishing Inc.

The Opponent
Detective Partner Hero Villain
American Dead
Eric Larue

all by Dramatic Publishing

Redbud

by Nick Hern Publishing

References

External links

 Artist Conversational: Playwright Brett Neveu
 Sunday Breakfast with Brett Neveu

20th-century American dramatists and playwrights
21st-century American dramatists and playwrights
Living people
American male dramatists and playwrights
20th-century American male writers
21st-century American male writers
Year of birth missing (living people)